Tsvetko Ruskov Slavov (born 28 March 1934) is a Bulgarian former basketball player. He competed in the men's tournament at the 1956 Summer Olympics, and the 1960 Summer Olympics.

References

External links
 

1934 births
Living people
Bulgarian men's basketball players
1959 FIBA World Championship players
Olympic basketball players of Bulgaria
Basketball players at the 1956 Summer Olympics
Basketball players at the 1960 Summer Olympics
Basketball players from Sofia